The 2011 Falsterbo Horse Show was the 2011 edition of the Falsterbo Horse Show, the Swedish official show jumping horse show. It was held as CSIO 5* and CDI 5*.

The first horse show were held 1920 in Falsterbo, in 1969 the first show jumping derby was held here.

The 2011 edition of the Falsterbo Horse Show was held July 7–10, 2011.

FEI Nations Cup of Sweden
The 2011 FEI Nations Cup of Sweden was part of the 2011 Falsterbo Horse Show. It was the fourth competition of the 2011 Meydan FEI Nations Cup and was held on Friday, July 8, 2011 at 2:30 pm. The competing teams were: the United States of America, Belgium, the Netherlands, Germany, Great Britain, Ireland, Denmark and France. Also a Swedish team as host nation had the chance to start in the competition.

The competition was a show jumping competition with two rounds and optionally one jump-off.

The competition is endowed with 200,000 €.

(grey penalties points do not count for the team result)

Notes

Grand Prix Freestyle (A-Final)
The 2011 Falsterbo Horse Show was the venue of the first competition of the World Dressage Masters (WDM) – rider ranking, season 2011/2012.

All competitors has started first in the Grand Prix de Dressage at Friday. The eight best-placed competitors of the Grand Prix de Dressage were allowed to start in the A-Final (the Grand Prix Freestyle). It some of best-placed competitors had want to start in the B-Final, the same number of competitors, who are placed after the best-placed competitors, had move up in the A-Final.

The Grand Prix Freestyle, the A-Final of the World Dressage Masters, is a Freestyle dressage competition. The level of this competition is at least the level of a Grand Prix de Dressage, but it can be higher than the level of a Grand Prix Spécial.

The Grand Prix Freestyle at the 2011 Falsterbo Horse Show was held on Saturday, July 9, 2011 at 1:00 pm. It is endowed with 60,000 €.

(top 5 of 8 competitors)

JMS Falsterbo Derby
The Falsterbo Derby was an important show jumping competition at the 2011 Falsterbo Horse Show. The sponsor of this competition is JMS. A Derby is a show jumping competition with special fences like walls or natural fences build of wood (another example of a derby competition in show jumping is the British Jumping Derby).

This competition was held on Saturday, July 9, 2011 at 3:45 pm. The competition was a show jumping competition with one round and one jump-off.

(Top 5 of 20 Competitors)

Grand Prix Spécial (B-Final)
The Grand Prix Spécial was the B-Final of the World Dressage Masters competitions at 2011 Falsterbo Horse Show (see also Grand Prix Freestyle).

The B-Final of the World Dressage Masters competitions at 2011 Falsterbo Horse Show was held on July 9, 2011 at 4:00 pm. It was endowed with 30,000 €. The B-Final was held as Grand Prix Spécial, the competition with the highest definite level of dressage competitions.

(top 3 of 7 competitors)

Longines Falsterbo Grand Prix
The Grand Prix was the mayor show jumping competition of the 2011 Falsterbo Horse Show. The sponsor of this competition was Longines. It was held on Sunday, July 10, 2011 at 3:00 pm. The competition was a show jumping competition with two rounds, the height of the fences were up to 1.60 meters.

(Top 5 of 44 Competitors)

References

External links
 
 2011 show jumping results
 2011 dressage results

2011 in show jumping
2011
2011 FEI Nations Cup
July 2011 sports events in Europe